is a third-person shooter mecha video game series developed by FromSoftware. The series centers on a silent protagonist who takes on work as a mercenary pilot in the far future, operating large robot combat units known as Armored Cores at the behest of corporate and private clients. As the player completes missions for these clients, they gain credits to improve their Armored Core and unlock further opportunities to make money. Some games include an "Arena" mode in which the player fights other Armored Core pilots in head-to-head battles, which can reward the player with further income or prestige.

Several story continuities exist, spread across 13 main games, seven spin-offs, and three remastered re-releases. The first game in the series, Armored Core, was released in 1997, while the most recent, Armored Core VI: Fires of Rubicon, will be released in 2023. The series has been released on the PlayStation, PlayStation 2, PlayStation Portable, PlayStation 3, PlayStation Vita, Xbox 360, and Mobile Phone.

Premise 
In the original continuity established by 1997's Armored Core through 2001's Armored Core 2: Another Age, Earth experienced a cataclysm known as the "Great Destruction" and humanity has been forced underground. Corporations begin fighting for dominance, leading to the increasing reliance on Armored Core pilots called Ravens. Following the events of 1999's Armored Core: Master of Arena, humanity rebuilds and colonizes Mars. Through 2000's Armored Core 2 and its expansion, Another Age, the fledgling Earth government struggles to maintain power as opportunistic corporations exploit the power gap and rebel groups resist against the hegemony of government and business interests.

The series was rebooted with 2002's Armored Core 3, beginning a new story arc that concluded with Armored Core: Last Raven in 2005. Following a global nuclear war, humanity has retreated underground. Following centuries of rule by an artificial intelligence called The Controller, its decay leads to the destruction of much of humanity's underground network, causing them to look toward the surface for safety. By the end of 2003's Silent Line: Armored Core, humanity has fully returned to the surface of Earth. The final two games of this continuity, 2004's Armored Core: Nexus and 2005's Armored Core: Last Raven involve the end of the existing power dynamic of corporations and Ravens fighting over the surface.

2006's Armored Core 4 rebooted the series yet again. Here, corporations have seized control of Earth governments and are waging war across the surface for dominance. A war waged over the course of the game pollutes the environment, leading to the creation of floating cities in 2008's Armored Core: For Answer. Depending on the player's choices, humanity either barely survives the fallout of For Answer's conflict or is completely eradicated.

The final story arc of the series was introduced with 2012's Armored Core V. A single corporation has dominance over a contaminated Earth and is being opposed by a resistance faction that seeks to overthrow them. 2013's Armored Core: Verdict Day details the outbreak of another war 100 years later following an apocalyptic event.

Gameplay 

Within the core games of the franchise, the gameplay is generally focused on the player taking the role of a mech-piloting mercenary, taking on missions for various clients and gaining currency from completing them. Missions can involve multiple objectives and pit the player against computer controlled opponents, some of which pilot mechs as well. Upon completion of a mission, the operating costs of the mech, such as repairs and ammunition, are deducted from the total earnings of the player. If the player loses a mission, those same deductions occur from the player's direct balance.

The game's mechs, called Armored Cores, are highly customizable with hundreds of parts and weapons that can be purchased from an in-game shop or by fulfilling certain requirements. Different parts can provide gameplay advantages in certain terrains or against certain enemies, which forces the player to put thought into how to approach the construction of their mech. Many of the franchise's games feature a branching storyline where taking on certain missions can block off others, with consequences of a player's decision in mission being relayed to them at the end of a mission.

An Arena mode introduced in Armored Core: Project Phantasma gave players the opportunity to fight opponents outside of missions for additional rewards. Project Phantasma also introduced the import feature, allowing players to retain their progress from a previous entry when starting a new one. This import feature would become a mainstay of the franchise, with "expansion" titles like Silent Line: Armored Core allowing for importing save data.

Multiplayer 
Since its first release, the Armored Core games have featured multiplayer options in some form. In the original PlayStation era, local split-screen multiplayer modes were the primary method, generally featuring head-to-head battles. A PlayStation Link Cable feature, allowing for the connection of two PlayStation consoles, was included in all three original Armored Core titles.

With the PlayStation 2, split-screen and console linking continue to be the primary source of multiplayer. 2004's Armored Core: Nexus introduced the LAN multiplayer mode, in addition to connecting through their internet service and allowed up to 4 players to fight in matches together.

Online multiplayer was first introduced in the Japanese release of Armored Core 2: Another Age, but was removed in other regions due to the PlayStation Network Adapter not being ready in time. No PlayStation 2-era game after this release would include online play either, with the first game to do so being Armored Core 4.

Games

Armored Core 

The original trilogy of Armored Core games were developed for the original PlayStation by FromSoftware and established many of the core themes and mechanics that would be found in the rest of the series. The debut title, Armored Core, was released on July 10, 1997 in Japan. Story elements like corporate-funded conflicts, post-apocalyptic settings, and silent protagonists were introduced in the first game. The game's mechanics revolve around taking on missions from various clients for pay, using earned money to customize the player's Armored Core unit.

Armored Core: Project Phantasma was released as a stand-alone expansion to the original game, released on December 4, 1997. Project Phantasma introduced an Arena mechanic that would be expanded on in later titles, as well as an import mechanic that would become an important feature through the franchise. Players were able to import save data from earlier Armored Core games and bring their existing Armored Core units into the expansions.

A second stand-alone expansion, Armored Core: Master of Arena, was released on February 4, 1999 and was the final game released for the original PlayStation. It concluded the core arc of the original Armored Core and greatly expanded on the Arena mechanic introduced in Project Phantasma. Like its predecessor, Master of Arena allowed players to import save files from both the original Armored Core and Project Phantasma to continue their progress.

All three games from the original PlayStation era were re-released on the PlayStation Network in 2007 for the tenth anniversary of the original title. The original Armored Core was also released on the Japanese PlayStation Classic in 2018.

Armored Core 2 

With the transition to the PlayStation 2, FromSoftware released Armored Core 2 as a launch title in Japan on August 3, 2000. As a narrative sequel to the original trilogy, Armored Core 2 transitioned the series away from the post-apocalyptic setting and added more science fiction elements, such as Mars colonization. Much of the gameplay remained the same, including the mission structure, customization, and Arena modes. The title did overhaul the visuals from the original game, taking advantage of the added power of the new console, but overall designs stayed similar. Unlike Project Phantasma and Master of Arena, players could not import their saves to the new game.

Armored Core 2: Another Age was released on April 12, 2001 as a stand-alone expansion. It allowed players to import their save files from Armored Core 2 and continue with their existing Armored Core units. The game introduced movement controls using the DualShock analog sticks and cooperative mission mode. The Japanese version of Armored Core 2 was the first title to include online broadband play, allowing players to fight each other over the internet.

Armored Core 3 

Armored Core 3 was released on April 4, 2002 and served as a reboot for the franchise. The story returned to a post-apocalyptic setting and retained the core concept of corporate warfare and mercenary mission structure. Very little gameplay was changed from the earlier PlayStation 2 titles, instead focusing on incremental improvements and minor features like USB mice, computer-controlled allies, and surround sound. Due to its nature as a reboot, players could not import save data from Armored Core 2 or Another Age.

A stand-alone expansion, Silent Line: Armored Core, was released on January 23, 2003 and was a direct sequel to Armored Core 3. Like other expansions in the franchise, players could import their progress from Armored Core 3 into Silent Line, retaining their parts and credits from the earlier game. Silent Line introduced new gameplay mechanics, including computer-controlled companions and a first person mode.

Armored Core: Nexus was released on March 18, 2004 as a direct sequel to Silent Line. Unlike its predecessor, Nexus was treated as a core entry rather than an expansion and did not allow for save data import. While carrying over parts from 3 and Silent Line, mechanics changed significantly compared to past expansions. The heat mechanic introduced in Armored Core 2 was made much more influential, especially with the introduction of booster heat. All part stats were also totally redistributed. The game was the first in the franchise to include support for dual analog sticks. It also introduced a new LAN multiplayer mode that allowed up to 4 players to participate in matches against each other.

Armored Core: Last Raven was released on August 4, 2005 and served as the conclusion to Armored Core 3's story arc. The game is structured around a 24-hour clock that moves forward as missions progress. At the end of the 24-hour period, choices made by the player can alter the outcome of the plot. The game introduced a component damage system, allowing for individual parts to be broken in combat.

Armored Core 4 

Armored Core 4 was released on December 21, 2006 for the PlayStation 3, serving as another reboot for the franchise. An Xbox 360 version, the first instance of a main title in the franchise being released outside of the PlayStation ecosystem, was released on March 22, 2007. Gameplay in Armored Core 4 has been sped up and streamlined from its predecessors in an attempt to make the game more accessible to new players. The game marks the first instance of online multiplayer outside of the Japanese release of Armored Core 2: Another Age.

Armored Core: For Answer was released on March 19, 2008 as a standalone expansion to Armored Core 4. It incorporates an online co-operative mode and a branching storyline. The game was noted for its technical problems on the PlayStation 3 version. Like Nexus, this game did not simply add content to its predecessor and changed gameplay by greatly increasing booster speeds and increasing generator performance.

Armored Core V 

Armored Core V was released on January 26, 2012 for the PlayStation 3 and Xbox 360 and acts as indirect sequel to Armored Core 4 and Armored Core: For Answer. The game focuses on the online multiplayer component and includes far fewer offline story missions than its predecessors. In the game's online mode, players battle for territory in teams of up to 20 players. A co-operative mode is included for players to fight NPCs alongside other players for various rewards.

Armored Core: Verdict Day was released on September 24, 2013 as a standalone expansion to Armored Core V. The game retains its predecessor's multiplayer focus, though it allows players to create teams of AI companions instead of requiring teams composed entirely of players. A full-length story mode returns alongside a newly implemented "hardcore mode", and players can import their saved games from Armored Core V to retain their personalized mechs.

Armored Core VI: Fires of Rubicon 

Armored Core VI: Fires of Rubicon was announced at The Game Awards 2022 on December 8. The game will be released on PlayStation 4, PlayStation 5, Windows, Xbox One, and Xbox Series X/S in 2023.

Spin-offs 

In 2004, FromSoftware released two spin-offs from the main Armored Core series. The first, Armored Core: Nine Breaker was released on October 28, 2004 for the PlayStation 2. Removing the focus from story-based missions, the game is instead built around an Arena mode where the player must compete with computer-controlled opponents to increase their rank. Minigames designed as training exercises were included to allow players to practice specific skills.

Armored Core: Formula Front was released on December 12, 2004 for the PlayStation Portable. Like Nine Breaker, its focus was on Arena-style gameplay, though a new mechanic put a focus on building an artificial intelligence strategy for the Armored Core units to execute. Formula Front was later released for the PlayStation 2 in Japan.

Several mobile games were released in the Armored Core franchise from 2004 to 2008, but they were never released outside of Japan. An American version of these mobile games was in development around 2005, but the title was never released.

Other media
Armored Core: Tower City Blade is a manga by Fujimi Shobo based on the game. It was serialized in Dragon Age Pure between March 14 and April 14, 2007. A project called Armored Core: Fort Tower Song was to consist of a book and an anime also released in 2007. The book was completed but the anime was not. From Software announced in 2011 that the anime had been canceled due to View Works shutting down.

Legacy
The making of Armored Core solidified FromSoftware's development skills, and in July 1999, they released the multiplayer action game Frame Gride for the Sega Dreamcast. The company's focus would shift from RPGs to mech games due in part to the success of the Armored Core series. In 2002, FromSoftware released the mech action game Murakumo: Renegade Mech Pursuit for the Xbox. In 2004, they released another Xbox title, Metal Wolf Chaos. In 2005, FromSoftware would start to produce a series of licensed games based on the various anime properties under the banner Another Century's Episode. Kenichiro Tsukuda, the producer of the Armored Core series produced a very similar video game called Daemon X Machina that was released for the Nintendo Switch and Microsoft Windows.

Footnotes

Notes

References

External links
  

 
Third-person shooters
Kadokawa Dwango franchises
Video games about mecha
Video game franchises
Video game franchises introduced in 1997